The Drag is a nickname for a portion of Guadalupe Street that runs along the western edge of the University of Texas campus in Austin, Texas.

The Drag began as a strip of shops which provided vital resources to UT students. Bookstores, restaurants, and clothing stores fulfilled student needs. The proximity to campus, particularly the Main Building and the Union Building, added to the popularity of the street.

Past and present buildings on the Drag include the Harry Ransom Humanities Research Center, Raul's, Captain Quackenbush's Intergalactic Espresso and Dessert Company, Record Exchange (later renamed Sound Exchange at the NW corner of 21st Street), Hastings Music and Video (directly across from the West Mall and Student Union), Bevo's Bookstore, Urban Outfitters (at the SW corner of 24th Street), Varsity Theater which became Tower Records, Kerbey Lane Cafe, The Bazaar, Texadelphia, Dobie Mall, Goodall Wooten private dormitory, the University Baptist Church, and the University Co-op.

The Drag is considered an important part of Austin's civic life, but for many years many Austinites avoided it because of congestion. The area had fallen into disrepair, and some felt the area had become undesirable because of the presence of panhandlers known as "Dragworms", or more recently as "Dragrats."

A project under the proposed Corridor Mobility Program (created under the 2016 Austin Mobility Bond approved by voters) would convert Guadalupe along the Drag from four travel lanes with discontinuous bike lanes, to three travel lanes (one being a dedicated turning lane), two dedicated transit lanes, and two continuous bike lanes. This project is projected to reduce CapMetro travel time through the corridor by up to three minutes. The project would also improve the surrounding streets in the West Campus neighborhood. Implementation of the Capital MetroRail Orange Line may remove private cars entirely off of Guadalupe Street.

Properties

The 91-room Goodall Wooten, nicknamed "The Woo", was a privately-operated dormitory building, built in 1956, that was not affiliated in any way with the university administration. By the late 2010s rents were relatively inexpensive compared to other area student housing. In 2018 it had about 60 residents; that year they were forced to leave. American Campus Communities purchased the buildings and had anticipated developing a new dormitory building.

References

Further reading

External links

Guadalupe Street, Guide to Texas Outside. Photos from the history of Guadalupe Street.

Culture of Austin, Texas
Streets in Austin, Texas
University of Texas at Austin